A nihilist is person who subscribes to nihilism, the belief that existence has no objective meaning, purpose, or intrinsic value.

Nihilist may also refer to:

 Nihilist movement, a cultural and philosophical movement in Russia from the late 19th century
 The Nihilist (film), a 1905 film by  Wallace McCutcheon, Sr.
 Nihilist (band), a Swedish death metal band
 The Nihilist (album), a 2014 album by Liam Finn
 Nihilist, a 1996 album by Sarin, a band fronted by Stephen O'Malley
 Nihilist Records, an American record label

See also